The Sankey Viaduct is a railway viaduct in North West England. It is a designated Grade I listed building and has been described as being "the earliest major railway viaduct in the world".

In 1826, the Liverpool and Manchester Railway Company (L&MR) was authorised to construct the world's first intercity railway. One obstacle on the selected  route between Liverpool and Manchester was the Sankey Valley. The company's principal engineer, George Stephenson, designed the Sankey Viaduct for the double-track railway to traverse the valley and Sankey Canal with sufficient clearance for the masts and sails of the Mersey flats that used the canal.

The viaduct was built between 1828 and 1830, although work on the structure did not finish until the middle of 1833. On 15 September 1830, the viaduct was opened along with the Liverpool & Manchester railway. During 2015, Network Rail installed overhead line equipment as part of a wider electrification programme.

History

Background

In 1826, the Act for the Liverpool & Manchester Railway (L&MR), the world's first intercity railway, was passed by Parliament. George Stephenson was the company's principal engineer for the  route between Liverpool and Manchester. The route required crossing the Sankey valley west of Newton-le-Willows, about halfway along the line.

The Sankey valley contained two obstacles, the Sankey Brook and the Sankey Canal that was constructed to link the St Helens coalfield to the River Mersey. The engineered waterway could be regarded as the first canal built in England since Roman times.

To traverse the Sankey Valley, Stephenson had to devise a route for the railway to pass without obstructing barges on the canals and maintain gradients for steam locomotives using the route. The Sankey Brook Navigation Company objected to the Liverpool & Manchester Railway's intended route and insisted that any structure across the valley must provide a minimum clearance of 18.3 meters above the water to allow fully-rigged Mersey flats to pass underneath.

Stephenson designed the viaduct in conjunction with Thomas Longridge Gooch, his chief draughtsman. Constructed from yellow sandstone and red brick, the viaduct is of nine round-headed arches carried on piers that incline sharply from the base towards the top. Its form is similar to the traditional designs of canal aqueducts.

Construction

Work commenced on the embankment for the western approach in June 1827. The embankment was constructed of more than 100,000 tonnes of clay, marl and moss, which was compacted with brushwood. The clay was excavated from the sides of the valley. On completion, trees were planted to provide a natural camouflage for the structure. During the first half of 1828, William Allcard (1809–61) was appointed resident engineer for the mid-section of the Liverpool & Manchester railway, which included the Sankey Viaduct and Kenyon cutting.

During spring 1828, work commenced on piling for the viaduct's foundations, which was necessary because of the soft conditions of the ground. The splayed bases of the viaduct's piers are built on sandstone foundation slabs, which was quarried from the nearby Olive Mount Cutting.

In summer 1829, the piers were completed and work began on the superstructure. By February 1830, the parapet walls had been completed. The cost of the viaduct, which was known locally as the Nine Arches Viaduct, was between £45,200 and £46,000.

On 15 September 1830, the viaduct was opened with the Liverpool & Manchester railway. Before its formal opening, a number of passengers had been transported across on special excursion trains. In July 1833, work on the structure included the addition of copings to the parapet walls.

It has nine semicircular arches of  span,  rise, and is of red brick with yellow sandstone facings. The arches are supported on eight rectangular piers and abutments at either end of the structure. The curved wing walls of the abutments retain the ends of the embankments. Projecting pilasters form rectangular cutwaters, which extend up the face of the piers to form part of the parapet walls.

The retaining walls of the western embankment have been strengthened by the addition of stay bolts, which extend deep inside the embankment and bolt fixings set onto the faces of the retaining walls. Concrete has been applied to some of the vertical pilasters and areas of the masonry.

During 1931, the Sankey Canal was abandoned north of the viaduct. In 1963, the last navigable section closed and the waterway was subsequently infilled; the canal beneath the viaduct was infilled during 2002.

During February 1966, the viaduct received grade I listed building status, attributed to its "international significance being the earliest major railway viaduct in the world".

During the first half of 2015, Network Rail installed overhead line equipment for the line's electrification.

In popular culture
The Sankey Viaduct is the scene of an 1852 murder in The Railway Viaduct (2006), a detective mystery novel by Keith Miles writing as Edward Marston.

See also

Grade I and II* listed buildings in Warrington
Grade I listed buildings in Merseyside
Listed buildings in St Helens, Merseyside
Listed buildings in Burtonwood and Westbrook
North West England electrification schemes

References

Further reading

External links

 
 
 Images of the viaduct
 Newton-le-Willows: Sankey Viaduct and Embankment

Grade I listed buildings in Merseyside
Buildings and structures in the Metropolitan Borough of St Helens
Grade I listed buildings in Cheshire
Bridges completed in 1830
Railway viaducts in Cheshire
Railway viaducts in Merseyside
Grade I listed railway bridges and viaducts
1830 establishments in England
Newton-le-Willows